Maddela, officially the Municipality of Maddela, is a 1st class municipality in the province of Quirino, Philippines. According to the 2020 census, it has a population of 40,943 people.

Maddela is the commercial hub of the province. It is between the provinces of Isabela and Aurora.

Geography

Barangays
Maddela is politically subdivided into 32 barangays. These barangays are headed by elected officials: Barangay Captain, Barangay Council, whose members are called Barangay Councilors. All are elected every three years.

Climate

Demographics

Economy

Government
Maddela, belonging to the lone congressional district of the province of Quirino, is governed by a mayor designated as its local chief executive and by a municipal council as its legislative body in accordance with the Local Government Code. The mayor, vice mayor, and the councilors are elected directly by the people through an election which is being held every three years.

Elected officials

Education
The Schools Division of Quirino governs the town's public education system. The division office is a field office of the DepEd in Cagayan Valley region. The office governs the public and private elementary and public and private high schools throughout the municipality.

Tourism
The famous Governors Rapid can be found in Maddela, in the Barangay of Divisoria Sur. It gained fame and attracted tourists after it was featured on Rated K of ABS-CBN along with the Siitan Nature Park in Nagtipunan, one of the Municipalities of Quirino Province.

Maddela is also known for its festival, the Panagsasalog. It is an Ilocano term for "farmers on their way to farm". The Panagsasalog Festival is celebrated annually on July 10–12. The festival is also celebrated with the Search for Mutya ng Maddela along with some contests. On the last day, there is a parade of the reigning pageant winners, municipal officials, and barangay officials and with the drum and lyre corps of the near elementary and high schools.

References

External links
Maddela Profile at PhilAtlas.com
[ Philippine Standard Geographic Code]
Philippine Census Information
Local Governance Performance Management System

Municipalities of Quirino